Christopher Riley (born 1967) is a British writer, broadcaster and film maker specialising in the history of science. He has a PhD from Imperial College, University of London where he pioneered the use of digital elevation models in the study of mountain range geomorphology and evolution. He makes frequent appearances on British television and radio, broadcasting mainly on space flight, astronomy and planetary science and was Visiting Professor of science and media at the University of Lincoln between 2011 and 2021.

Education
Riley went to school in Cambridge, where he grew up. He studied geology at the University of Leicester for his first degree and completed his PhD at Imperial College, University of London in the mid 1990s.

Career
Riley is a veteran of two NASA astrobiology missions (Leonid MAC) from 1998 and 1999 – reporting on their progress for BBC News.  He co-presented the BBC's live coverage of the 1999, 2001 and 2015 solar eclipses, and has fronted their astronomy magazine show Final Frontier, their cosmology series Journeys in Time and Space, and their live All Night Star Party – a co-production with the Open University.  In 2006 he wrote and presented BBC Radio 4's cosmology series The Cosmic Hunters.  Other documentaries he's written and presented for BBC Radio 4 include Save the Moon (2014) and For All Mankind (2012).

Behind the camera he has written and directed more than 50 films for the BBC's classic science magazine show Tomorrow's World and was a producer and director on series six of Rough Science.

In 2004 he produced the BBC's two-part drama documentary Space Odyssey: Voyage to the Planets. He was the science consultant on the BBC's remakes of their science fiction cult classics A for Andromeda (2006) and The Quatermass Experiment (2005). He directed and produced on the feature documentary film In the Shadow of the Moon, which premiered at the 2007 Sundance Film Festival, where it won the World Cinema Audience Documentary Award. The film was released in the US and Europe during the autumn of 2007.

Riley directed on the spinoff six-part series Moon Machines for the Discovery Channel in 2008, which celebrated the 400,000 engineers who'd made the Moonshots possible. The series aired in the US and the UK in June that year.

During the making of In the Shadow of the Moon, Riley rediscovered the only surviving 35mm print of the complete version of NASA's original Apollo 11 documentary film Moonwalk One which had been stored under the film's director Theo Kamecke's desk since it was made. With NASA's blessing, the pair worked to restore and remaster the feature film and re-released it in time for the 40th anniversary of the flight of Apollo 11 in July 2009.

At the Cheltenham Science Festival in 2009 he presented research conducted with forensic linguist John Olsson on the recordings of Neil Armstrong's first words spoken on the surface of the Moon in July 1969. Their study confirmed that the "a" was missing – contradicting previous conclusions presented by Peter Shann Ford in 2006. Olsson and Riley went on to show that the words were spoken spontaneously and were not rehearsed or composed by some 'wordsmith' beforehand as many have speculated they might have been.

In 2011 Riley teamed up with the European Space Agency and Italian astronaut Paolo Nespoli to make the feature-length documentary First Orbit which re-created Yuri Gagarin's pioneering spaceflight Vostok 1. The film was recorded by matching the orbit of the International Space Station to the ground path of Vostok 1, and released for free to celebrate the 50th anniversary of the pioneering human space flight.

He produced Kevin Fong's 2011 portrait of the Space Shuttle for BBC Two and Produced and Directed a 2012 film presented by Dallas Campbell which celebrated thirty-five years of NASA's Voyager Program for BBC Four.  The same year Riley collaborated with Neil Armstrong's family to produce and direct the biopic First Man on the Moon, which premiered on BBC Two at the end of 2012 and on PBS Nova in December 2014.  The film included interviews with Armstrong's sister June, brother Dean, and childhood friend Kocho Solacoff.

In 2013 Riley produced and directed a biopic of Nobel Prize–winning physicist Richard Feynman for the BBC. The Fantastic Mr Feynman aired on BBC Two in May that year, in time for what would have been Feynman's 95th birthday. It was the first biographical film about Feynman which the BBC had commissioned since Christopher Sykes' groundbreaking documentaries in the early 1980s. The film includes interviews with his son Carl, his daughter Michelle and his sister, physicist Joan Feynman who Riley subsequently wrote a short biography about.

In 2014 he produced and directed a documentary about American neuroscientist John Lilly's controversial 1960s attempts to build an interspecies communications bridge between humans and dolphins.  The film included the only onscreen interview recorded with the female researcher at the centre of the work - Margaret Howe Lovatt, who had reportedly developed a close relationship with one of the animals. The resulting film, The Girl who talked to Dolphins, premiered at the 2014 Sheffield International Documentary Festival and received widespread five star reviews; The Telegraph noting that "the anti-sensationalist approach of Riley's superb documentary was its trump card." The film was nominated for both a BAFTA and an RTS award the same year and for a Grierson award in 2015.

In 2015 it was announced that Riley would direct a new film on the Hubble Space Telescope for National Geographic Channels. The resulting documentary Hubble's Cosmic Journey included contributions from cosmologist Stephen Hawking, astrophysicist Ed Weiler and Charlie Pellerin, US Senator Barbara Mikulski and astronauts Story Musgrave, Charlie Bolden and John Grunsfeld. It premiered at National Geographic's Washington headquarters on 14 April 2015 and received its network premiere in 171 countries the following week. The film is narrated by astrophysicist Neil deGrasse Tyson, and was nominated for an Emmy in 2015.

In October 2015 Riley's long-awaited feature documentary The Fear of 13 received its world premiere at the BFI London Film Festival where it was nominated for Best Documentary. The film tells the life story of death row prisoner Nicholas Yarris, and took Riley over seven years to make, working without funding for the project for much of that time. The title refers to triskaidekaphobia, the fear of the number 13, just one of the many words learned by prisoner Nick Yarris while absorbing thousands of books during his 20-year stay on Death Row in a Pennsylvania prison. It was received well by the critics scoring 92% on the review-aggregate site Rotten Tomatoes. The film received its network premiere on the BBC's Storyville series on 31 January 2016, and was picked up by Netflix across the rest of the world.

Riley collaborated with astronaut Paolo Nespoli for a second time in 2016–2017 to work on National Geographic's series One Strange Rock, with Paolo filming on board the International Space Station for the final episode 'Home' during Expedition 52 which featured astronaut Peggy Whitson's last NASA mission. Riley directed across the series and wrote and directed the episode 'Survival' featuring astronaut Jerry Linenger. The series is hosted by actor Will Smith

Awards and honours
In 2005 Riley was given a Sir Arthur Clarke Award for his work producing the BBC's Space Odyssey series.  The same year he was elected a Fellow of the Royal Astronomical Society for his endeavours in communicating astronomy to the public. His films and TV series on the history of science have won a nomination from the Royal Television Society and the World Cinema Audience Award at the Sundance Film Festival 2007.  He received a second Sir Arthur Clarke Award in 2008 for In the Shadow of the Moon. His 2012 documentary Voyager – to the final frontier was nominated for a British Science Writer's award, and his 2014 film The Girl who talked to Dolphins, was nominated for BAFTA, RTS and Grierson awards. His 2015 film for National Geographic, Hubble's Comsic Journey, was nominated for an Emmy.
His 2019 book, Where once we stood, a collaboration with artist Martin Impey, was nominated for a CILIP Kate Greenaway medal in 2020.
Riley's 2021 film for National Geographic - Battle for the Black Swan, won the Gold Medal for History and Society at the New York Festivals TV & Film Awards in 2022, and was nominated for a BAFTA the same year.

Film and television

He has directed, produced, science consulted or hosted on the following films and TV series (incomplete):

2021: One Cup, a Thousand Stories, BBC Studios, Migu
2021: Battle for the Black Swan, National Geographic, Disney+
2020: Future Fantastic; China's Science Revolution, CIPG, Discovery Channel
2019: Back to the Moon, PBS NOVA
2019: Revolutions/Breakthrough, BBC, PBS
2019: Rise of the Rockets, PBS NOVA
2018: Eric Whitacre's Deep Field, iTunes, YouTube
2018: One Strange Rock, National Geographic Channel
2016: Survival in the Skies, Smithsonian Channel
2015: The Fear of 13, BBC Storyville, NetFlix
2015: End of the World Night, TwoFour, Channel 4
2015: Hubble's Cosmic Journey, Bigger Bang, National Geographic Channel
2015: The Sky at Night, Hubble Anniversary Special, BBC FOUR
2015: Stargazing Live, Total Eclipse Special, BBC ONE
2014: The Girl who talked to Dolphins, BBC Scotland, BBC FOUR
2013: Richard Hammond Builds a Planet, BBC Scotland, BBC ONE
2013: The Fantastic Mr Feynman, BBC Scotland, BBC TWO, Netflix
2012: Neil Armstrong. First Man on the Moon, Darlow Smithson, BBC TWO, PBS, Netflix
2012: Voyager: to the final frontier, BBC Scotland, BBC FOUR
2011: Dark Matters, Wide Eyed Entertainment, Science Channel
2011: Space Shuttle – the final mission, Ricochet Television, BBC TWO
2011: James May's Things You Need To Know, The Universe, Impossible Pictures, BBC TWO
2011: First Orbit, The Attic Room, YouTube, BBC Big Screens
2011: Destination Titan, BBC TWO/FOUR
2011: Outcasts, Kudos, BBC ONE
2010: Dust, Stylus Films, The Attic Room, Shorts International
2009: One Small Step – The Australian Story, Freehand, BBC Worldwide
2009: James May on the Moon, BBC TWO/FOUR
2009: Moonwalk One – the director's cut, BHP Group, DVD, Discovery Channel (UK)
2009: Music for Astronauts and Cosmonauts, BFI, DVD
2008: When We Left Earth: The NASA Missions, Discovery Channel
2008: Moon Machines, Discovery Science Channel
2007: In the Shadow of the Moon, Film 4, THINK Film, Discovery Films
2006: A for Andromeda
2005: Rough Science, Series 6, BBC TV
2005: The Quatermass Experiment
2004: Space Odyssey: Voyage to the Planets, BBC ONE, Discovery Channel
2004: Space Odyssey: the robot pioneers, BBC FOUR, Discovery Channel
2003: All Night Star Party, BBC TWO
2002: Can't Get Enough, BBC TWO
2002: Tomorrow's World, Series 38, BBC ONE
2001: Secret Life of Ghosts and Werewolves, BBC ONE
2001: Tomorrow's World, Series 37, BBC ONE
2001: Final Frontier, BBC TWO
2001: Journeys in Time and Space, BBC KNOWLEDGE
2000: Tomorrow's World, Series 36, BBC ONE
2000: 2000 Today, BBC ONE
1999: Eclipse Live, BBC ONE
1999: The Planets, BBC TWO

Video installations and art commissions 
In 2009, to coincide with the 40th Anniversary of the flight of Apollo 11, Riley collaborated with the London Science Museum on a novel video installation called "Apollo Raw and Uncut" which projected all 23 hours of NASA's 16mm Apollo flight film, shot on Apollo missions AS-501 (Apollo 4) to AS-512 (Apollo 17). Much of this footage, including an almost 8-minute sequence documenting a long drive across the rugged Descartes Highlands had never been screened in its entirety in public before.  The aim of the installation was to present the story of Apollo in as unedited and unfiltered form as possible. The work was screened again in Montreal, Quebec, in November 2009, as part of an exhibition at the Canadian Centre for Architecture called 'Intermission: Films from a Heroic Future', which Riley also helped to curate, and a third time in 2013 at Lincoln's Digital Culture Festival Frequency

Continuing the presentation of overlooked space film archives in public gallery spaces Chris collaborated with the London-based creative science agency super/collider on his 2011 show Cone Crater – a 40th anniversary celebration of Alan Shepard and Edgar Mitchell's exploration of the Frau Mauro lunar highlands, which played at The Book Club, London as part of the Apollo's End project.

In 2019 Riley collaborated with 59 Productions, on their Smithsonian Air and Space Museum commission "Apollo 50:Go for the Moon" - writing the show and creating a film to complement projections onto the Washington Monument to tell the story of Apollo 11 for the 50th anniversary of the mission in July that year.

In the run-up to NASA's Perseverance mission touching down on Mars in 2021 Riley created an artwork called Worlds Apart, that mapped all NASA's previous Martian landing sites back onto their equivalent locations on Earth in terms of latitude and longitude, to draw attention to climate change. Following the successful Mars 2020 landing, Riley teamed up with the BBC World Service radio programme Digital Planet to find volunteers to travel to Andegaon Wadi, Sawali, in the central Indian state of Maharashtra (18.445°N, 77.451°E) which mapped onto the new Perseverance landing site.

Books
Riley has written, co-written and contributed to over a dozen books, including Where once we stood, a collaboration with artist and illustrator Martin Impey, nominated for a Kate Greenaway medal in 2020.

Selected articles

See also
Mars 2020 twinned location to Earth
The Fear of 13
First Orbit
Moonwalk One
In the Shadow of the Moon
Space Odyssey: Voyage to the Planets
The Quatermass Experiment
A for Andromeda
Tomorrow's World

References

External links 

Alumni of Imperial College London
BBC Radio 4 presenters
English film producers
English science fiction writers
English documentary filmmakers
1967 births
Living people